Eagle Point Park encompasses  of a  coastal nature preserve in Pasco County, Florida west of US 19 and includes trails, a canoe and kayak launch dock, playground equipment, three fishing piers, and picnic shelters. It opened in 2010 after six years in planning and construction following the property's being purchased in order to forestall development. Pasco Palms Preserve is adjacent to the park.

References

Parks in Pasco County, Florida